Cymbocarpum is a genus of flowering plants belonging to the family Apiaceae.

Its native range is Western Asia, Caucasus.

Species:

Cymbocarpum alinihatii 
Cymbocarpum amanum 
Cymbocarpum anethoides 
Cymbocarpum erythraeum 
Cymbocarpum wiedemannii

References

Apioideae
Apioideae genera